Hoosier Township is one of twelve townships in Clay County, Illinois, USA.  As of the 2010 census, its population was 338 and it contained 165 housing units.

Geography

Cities, towns, villages
 Sailor Springs (west quarter)

Unincorporated towns
 Hoosier
(This list is based on USGS data and may include former settlements.)

Cemeteries
The township contains these six cemeteries: Dillman, Hoosier Prairie, Kinnamon, McKnight, Number Four and White.

Demographics

School districts
 Clay City Community Unit District 10
 North Clay Community Unit School District 25

Political districts
 Illinois' 19th congressional district
 State House District 108
 State Senate District 54

References
 
 United States Census Bureau 2007 TIGER/Line Shapefiles
 United States National Atlas

External links
 City-Data.com
 Illinois State Archives

Townships in Clay County, Illinois
Townships in Illinois